is a Japanese professional footballer who plays as a winger for Bundesliga club Schalke 04.

Club career
Kōzuki was promoted to the first team of J2 League club Kyoto Sanga in 2018.

He joined German club 1. FC Düren of the fifth-tier Mittelrheinliga in February 2022.

On 26 August 2022, Kōzuki agreed to join Bundesliga side Schalke 04, where he was initially assigned to the reserve team. However, following his performances in the Regionalliga West, in December of the same year the Japanese player was promoted to the first team and signed his first professional contract in the process, by penning a deal until 2025, with an option for an automatic extension based on a certain number of appearances. He scored his first Bundesliga goal in his second debut against RB Leipzig.

International career 
Kōzuki has represented Japan at various youth international levels, having played for all the national teams from the under-16 to the under-19 setup.

Career statistics

References

External links
 Profile at the FC Schalke 04 website
 

2000 births
Living people
Association football people from Kyoto Prefecture
Japanese footballers
Association football midfielders
Kyoto Sanga FC players
FC Schalke 04 II players
FC Schalke 04 players
Bundesliga players
Oberliga (football) players
Regionalliga players
J2 League players
Japanese expatriate footballers
Japanese expatriate sportspeople in Germany
Expatriate footballers in Germany